Berglen is a municipality in the district of Rems-Murr in Baden-Württemberg in Germany.

Geography

Geographical location
The community Berglen is located about 25 kilometers east of Stuttgart in 300 to 450 meters altitude in the Keuper hill landscape  Berglen .

Constituent communities
The municipality Berglen consists of the following nine districts: Bretzacker, Hößlinswart, Barrenhardt, Öschelbronn, Oppelsbohm, Reichenbach near Winnenden, Rettersburg, Steinach, Vorderweißbuch.

Space division
Total 2587 ha
 879 ha = 34,0 % forest 
 1352ha = 52,3 % agriculture
 10 ha = 0,4 % recovery area
 8 ha = 0,3 % water
 162 ha = 6,1 % buildings
 158 ha = 6,1 % traffic area
 17 ha = 0,7 % others
.

Religions
Since the Reformation the area of Berglen has been predominantly Lutheran. There are Protestant churches in Oppelsbohm and Hößlinswart. The church in Remshalden Buoch, to the south-west of Berglen is responsible for several districts.

Mayor
 Gerhard Schnabel, Mayor of the former municipalities of Vorderweißbuch and Oppelsbohm from 1964 to 1972, and mayor of Berglen from 1972 to 1996
 Wolfgang Schille, Mayor from 1996 to 2012
 Maximilian Friedrich, Mayor since 2012-09-13

Partnerships
Berglen has been in a partnership with Krögis, today part of Käbschütztal in Saxony since October 3, 1993.

Economy and infrastructure

Education
With the neighborhood school  In the Berglen  there is a primary and high school with Werkrealschule. Moreover, Steinach and Vorderweißbuch have their own primary schools. Schools can be visited in the neighboring cities. For the youngest members of the community there are six municipal nursery schools, and also a private forest kindergarten.

Regular events
  The Richtfest takes place annually in the Erlenhof district, organized by the Berglesbond  association, which was founded in 1992.
  There is a Street festival by local clubs in the Hößlinswart district.
  There is a Christmas market on the Saturday before the 3rd Sunday in Advent in the Birkenweißbuch district.
  The Linde Festival, organized by the Weißbuch Music Club (Musikverein), also takes place every year in the Birkenweißbuch district, usually in the first holiday weekend.

Personality

Freeman
 Werner Hofmann is the only honorary citizen of Berglen. The former school rector is the author of the chronicle and several native history books.

Sons and daughters of the town
 Friedrich von Klett (1781–1869), Württemberg administrative officer and Member of Parliament
 Johann Georg Hildt (1785–1863), foreman and architect
 Georg Bernhard Bilfinger (1798–1872), lawyer and politician
 Hansel Mieth (1909–1998), German-American photojournalist
 Jörg Hofmann (born 1955), trade unionist, president of IG Metall

Other people
 Otto Mörike (1897–1978), a resistance fighter against Nazism, who was a Lutheran pastor in Oppelsbohm, has been declared a member of Righteous Among the Nations
 Manfred Winkelhock (1951–1985), race driver, lived in the municipality until his death
 Denis Scheck (born 1964), German literary critic, translator and journalist, grew up in Bretzenacker

References

External links
 

Rems-Murr-Kreis
Württemberg